The Gulderstock is a mountain of the Glarus Alps, located north of Matt in the canton of Glarus. It lies south of the Magerrain, on the range between the valleys of Mülibach and Chrauchtal.

References

External links
 Gulderstock on Hikr

Mountains of the Alps
Mountains of Switzerland
Mountains of the canton of Glarus
Two-thousanders of Switzerland